Maison Carrée is an ancient building in Nîmes, southern France.

Maison Carrée may also refer to:

Maison-Carrée, Algeria, a former name for El Harrach, a suburb of the Algerian capital Algiers
Maison carrée d'Arlac, a neoclassical folly building constructed between 1785 and 1789, in the town of Mérignac just outside Bordeaux, France
Battle of Maison Carrée, an 1832 battle between the French Foreign Legion and Algerian natives of the El Ouiffa tribe